UrtheCast was a Vancouver-based Canadian earth observation company. It produced two of the cameras currently in use on the International Space Station. One is a medium resolution camera, while the other is the first ultra-high-definition (UHD) video camera in space. The company went public on the Toronto Stock Exchange in June 2013,  but was delisted in October 2020 after filing for creditor protection.

On June 22, 2015, UrtheCast announced plans to place a 16-satellite constellation in orbit called "OptiSAR" to image the earth with synthetic aperture radar (SAR) and optical cameras, in order to provide constant earth observation, regardless of time or weather. The following day, UrtheCast announced it had reached an agreement to buy Deimos Imaging, a Spanish-based earth observation company, as well as its two satellites.

On March 31, 2016, Urthecast announced plans to launch an additional satellite constellation into orbit called "UrtheDaily," which would be used for constant monitoring of the earth's surface.

The UK manufacturer SSTL was contracted to manufacture the satellites, while the Spanish organization "Elecnor Deimos" was contracted to design the ground control functions. The goal was to produce large amounts of earth observation imagery from multiple sensors, and upload the data to a user-friendly, cloud-based platform. The images and data would have been made available for further processing. UrtheDaily was in the final funding stages and was scheduled to launch in 2020. 

UrtheCast announced that the Industrial Technologies Office of Innovation, Science and Economic Development Canada was providing approximately CA$17.6 million (US$13.08 million) in funding. This grant is part of its Strategic Aerospace & Defense Initiative (SADI) program and provided financial support for the ongoing development of UrtheCast’s planned OptiSAR constellation.

In 2018, UrtheCast acquired Geosys from Land O'Lakes, Inc.

UrtheCast could not meet payments in 2019 and eventually went insolvent in 2021. A new start-up, EarthDaily Analytics, was spun out of this insolvency.

Missions
UrtheDaily was a planned global coverage constellation by UrtheCast aiming to acquire high-quality, multispectral imagery, at 5m GSD, all taken simultaneously from the same altitude every day.

SAR-XL is a technology for UrtheCast's OptiSAR Constellation that consists of eight tandem pairs of SAR and Optical Satellites in two orbit planes. UrtheCast is currently developing this technology.

References

Companies based in Vancouver
Companies formerly listed on the Toronto Stock Exchange
Aerospace engineering organizations
Aerospace companies